The Cool Cafe (full name: The Cool Cafe: Cool Tape Vol. 1) is the debut mixtape by American rapper Jaden Smith. It was released as a free download on DatPiff on October 1, 2012. The mixtape is a part of Smith's Cool Tape series which was followed up by CTV2, The Sunset Tapes: A Cool Tape Story, and CTV3: Cool Tape Vol. 3. Since its release, the mixtape has been downloaded over 100,000 times on DatPiff.

Background
The mixtape focuses on Jaden's skate lifestyle, his clothing/lifestyle brand MSFTSRep and supposedly some songs feature references of his former relationship with Vanessa Hudgens' younger sister, Stella Hudgens.

Promotion 
The mixtape was promoted through various music videos with, "Pumped Up Kicks (Like Me)" (A remix to Pumped Up Kicks), was released on August 6, 2012. The music video was directed by Mike Vargas.

The mixtape's second music video, "The Coolest", was released on September 24, 2012. The music video was directed by Mike Vargas.

The mixtape's third music video, "Find You Somewhere", was released on September 17, 2012, and features vocals from AcE and Willow Smith. The music video was directed by Jada Pinkett Smith.

The mixtape's fourth music video, "Hello", was released on March 26, 2013, and was directed by Moises Arias.

Track listing 
Credits adapted from DatPiff.

References

2012 mixtape albums
Jaden Smith albums